Paige Campbell (born 27 June 1996) is an Australian athlete. She competed in the senior women's race at the 2019 IAAF World Cross Country Championships held in Aarhus, Denmark. She finished in 29th place. She also competed in the women's 3000 metres steeplechase event at the 2019 World Athletics Championships held in Doha, Qatar.

References

External links
 

1996 births
Living people
Australian female middle-distance runners
Australian female steeplechase runners
Place of birth missing (living people)
World Athletics Championships athletes for Australia
Australian Athletics Championships winners
20th-century Australian women
21st-century Australian women